The Schwab Foundation for Social Entrepreneurship is a Swiss not-for-profit organization founded in 1998 that provides platforms at the country, regional and global levels to promote social entrepreneurship. The foundation is under the legal supervision of the Swiss Federal Government. Its headquarters are in Geneva, Switzerland. Each year, it selects 20–25 social entrepreneurs through a global "Social Entrepreneur of the Year" competition.

History 

In 1998, Klaus Schwab and his wife Hilde decided to create the independent not-for-profit Schwab Foundation for Social Entrepreneurship. Its mission was to promote social innovation. It was a complementary foundation to the World Economic Forum which Klaus Schwab had founded in 1971.

Pamela Hartigan, who joined in October 2000, was its first managing director. The Foundation is financed from the initial endowment provided by Klaus and Hilde Schwab plus grants and fees for services provided to individuals, foundations or companies.

Activities
The Foundation identifies rising social entrepreneurs under the age of 40 through its Forum of Young Global Leaders. The Foundation encourages the activists it identifies to work together as a team. This way ideas are shared and can attract funding from companies, Harvard and Stanford Universities, INSEAD and the support of leaders. providing backing from corporations and political, academic and communication leaders. The chosen people (260 people in 2013) serve on the Forum’s Global Agenda Councils. Case studies on specific social entrepreneurs are provided to leading academic institutions to incorporate into undergraduate and graduate level courses. Each year the Foundation selects 20-25 Social Entrepreneurs through a global “ Social Entrepreneur of the Year” competition. Winners include Mikaela Jade, for innovation in indigenous edu-tech.

Board of Directors
As of January 2015, the organization's Board of Directors consisted of:
Hilde Schwab (Chairperson, Co-Founder)
Klaus Schwab (Co-Founder)
Rick Aubry (Social Entrepreneur & Educator, Tulane University, United States)
Paulo Coelho (Author)
David Gergen (Director, Center for Public Leadership, John F. Kennedy School of Government, Harvard University, United States)
Princess Mathilde of Belgium (Honorary Board Member)
Zanele Mbeki (Former First Lady of South Africa)
Muhammad Yunus (Managing Director of Bangladesh's Grameen Bank)

References

External links

Entrepreneurship organizations
Social entrepreneurship